Guilty Pleasures is the first album by Norwegian recording artist Didrik Solli-Tangen, and was released on November 1, 2010. The album's lead single, "My Heart Is Yours", was released on January 20, 2010. On 6 February 2010, it was selected as the Norwegian entry for the Eurovision Song Contest 2010, held in Oslo in May 2010. The second single, "Best Kept Secret" featuring the Norwegian trumpet soloist Tine Thing Helseth, was released on September 3, 2010. At an interview on the day of the album's release date, Solli-Tangen confirmed that "Compass" would be the third single.

Track listing

Charts

External links
Didrik Solli-Tangen - Didrik Solli-Tangen official site
universalmusic.no - Product description
Class-A.no - Didrik Solli-Tangen represented by Class A

References

2010 debut albums